Sangbong Station is a station on the Seoul Subway Line 7, Gyeongchun Line & Gyeongui-Jungang Line. It is located in Sangbong-dong, Jungnang-gu, Seoul.

References

External links
 Station information from Korail

Railway stations in Seoul
Seoul Metropolitan Subway stations
Metro stations in Jungnang District
Railway stations opened in 1996